Mordellistena lebedevi is a beetle in the genus Mordellistena of the family Mordellidae. It was described in 1929 by Jan Roubal.

References

lebedevi
Beetles described in 1929